Love is an unincorporated community located in Butler County, Kentucky, United States.

History 
Although not at lot is known about the community of Love, Most residents farmed. Examples of what they grown were beans and corn as well as raising cattle.

The population is also unknown, however from a resident who grew up there in the 50s and 60s said that he remembers seeing around eight houses when he was a child.

References

Unincorporated communities in Butler County, Kentucky
Unincorporated communities in Kentucky